Gardena may refer to one of the following

Places
Gardena, California, a city
Gardena, North Dakota, a city
Gardena, Idaho, an unincorporated community
Gardena Pass, a high mountain pass in South Tyrol, Italy
Val Gardena, a valley in the Dolomites of northern Italy, best known as a skiing area.

Other uses
Gardena (company), a German manufacturer of gardening tools
Gardena (bug) a genus of thread-legged bug
HC Gardena, the Italian name of the ice hockey team HC Gherdëina

See also
 Gardenia (disambiguation)